Kevin Junee is an Australian former rugby league footballer who played as a  in the 1960s and 1970s. 

An Australian international and New South Wales interstate representative back, he played his club football in the New South Wales Rugby Football League premiership for Sydney teams Eastern Suburbs and Manly-Warringah.

Family
Kevin is the father of Australian dual code rugby league and rugby union player Darren Junee who also played rugby league for the Eastern Suburbs club between 1995 and 1998.

Career
Junee played all his junior football with Eastern Suburbs, breaking into the top grade in 1964 - the bleakest period in the club's history, winning just 2 matches that year and just 3 more in the following two. However this didn't stop Junee from breaking into the representative scene. In 1965, the speedy halfback was chosen for New South Wales and at the end of the 1967 NSWRFL season was selected for the 1967–68 Kangaroo Tour, becoming Kangaroo No. 422, though he did not play in a test match on the tour. In the 1970 NSWRFL season Junee was awarded the Rothmans Medal – rugby league's leading player award presented annually to the year's  best player. 
Premiership success was one of the few things that eluded Junee throughout his career. The closest he came was in 1972 when he was a member of the Eastern Suburbs side that was defeated by Manly in that year's Grand Final 19–14.

At the end of the 1973 season, Junee left Easts to join Manly in 1974 after a player swap brought his former halfback rival at Easts (and a 1973 premiership winner with Manly), Johnny Mayes back to the club. That year, Eastern Suburbs won their first premiership since 1945 and won again in 1975, losing only three games all season. To rub salt into these wounds, Mayes had just won a premiership with Manly in 1973 and was part of these two premiership winning sides. While playing for the Sea Eagles during the 1974 NSWRFL season Junee topped the season's try-scoring list with 23 tries, a club record at the time and still second all-time season for the club (as of 2017), only beaten by Phil Blake who crossed for 27 in 1983. Junee scored only 6 tries for Manly in 1975.

Junee returned to Easts for his final season in 1976 (Manly won the 1976 premiership), displacing Mayes at halfback before the emergence of an up-and-coming Kevin Hastings. Junee, who played 159 matches for Eastern Suburbs, has been made a life member of the club.

Post Playing
Junee went on to run a sports store in Bondi Junction for many years.

References

Australian rugby league players
Sydney Roosters players
Sydney Roosters captains
Australia national rugby league team players
Manly Warringah Sea Eagles players
Living people
Rugby league halfbacks
Year of birth missing (living people)
Rugby league players from Sydney